Gloria Talbott (February 7, 1931 – September 19, 2000) was an American film and television actress.

Early life and career
Gloria Maude Talbott was born in Glendale, California. Her great-grandfather Benjamin F. Patterson arrived from Ohio in 1882 and bought some acreage in the area. He later  assisted with the platting of the city.

She began her career as a child actress in such films as Maytime (1937), Sweet and Low-down (1944), and A Tree Grows In Brooklyn (1945). She attended Glendale High School. In 1947, she was chosen as the winner of the "Miss Glendale" beauty pageant. In November 1948, Talbott was in the cast of One Fine Day, a comedy presented on stage at the Biltmore Theater in Los Angeles.

Her sister, Lori Talbott (1925-2006), also became an actress. After leaving school, Talbott formed a dramatic group and played "arena"-style shows at various clubs. She stopped acting following her first marriage, and resumed after her divorce, working extensively in film and television.

Film roles

Talbott worked in film regularly during the 1950s. In 1952, she had the role of Rose Rodriguez in The Rodriguez Story featurette. She appeared in Crashout (1955), the Humphrey Bogart comedy We're No Angels (1955), Lucy Gallant (1955), and All That Heaven Allows (1955).

She appeared in The Oregon Trail with Fred MacMurray as an Indian named Shona.

She later became known as a "scream queen", after appearing in a number of horror films, including The Daughter of Dr. Jekyll (1957), The Cyclops (1957), I Married a Monster from Outer Space (1958), and The Leech Woman (1960).

Her final film role was as Bri Quince, the love interest in the 1966 Western film An Eye for an Eye.

Television roles

In 1953, Talbott appeared in "The Crime of Sylvester Bonnard" and "High Seas" on Favorite Story and starred in "The Dear Departed" on Chevron Theatre. 

In 1955, she appeared in TV Reader's Digest episode "America's First Great Lady" as Pocahontas and was the first guest star with roles in both of the 1955 season's new adult Westerns, Gunsmoke, episode  "Home Surgery" and The Life and Legend of Wyatt Earp, episode 2 "Mr. Earp Meets a Lady".

On November 27, 1956, she starred as Maureen in a science-fiction episode of the television anthology series Conflict entitled "Man From 1997" featuring Charlie Ruggles and James Garner. She guest-starred in the premiere episode of Mr. Adams and Eve, "The Young Actress", which was broadcast on January 4, 1957. On October 1, 1957, she appeared as Linda Brazwell in the episode "Reluctant Hero" of the ABC/Warner Bros. Western television series Sugarfoot.

Talbott's multiple television credits also include the syndicated Adventures of Superman, The Range Rider, The Cisco Kid, the NBC Western anthology series Frontier (1955), and the syndicated Western-themed crime drama, Sheriff of Cochise with John Bromfield. She appeared in the 1956 episode "The Singing Preacher" of the religious anthology series, Crossroads.

In a broadcast on NBC on January 27, 1958, Talbott played Valya in star/producer John Payne's The Restless Gun, season one, episode 19, "Hang and Be Damned". She was cast in the syndicated American Civil War drama Gray Ghost, the 1958 episode "Fatal Memory" on CBS's Wanted: Dead or Alive (returning for the 1960 episode  "Tolliver Bender"), the 1959 episode "Have Sword, Will Duel" of the NBC Western Cimarron City, and in the 1961 NBC Western Whispering Smith in the role of Cora Gates.

She guest-starred as Jenny in the 1958 episode "A Cup of Black Coffee" of the CBS crime drama Richard Diamond, Private Detective, reprising the pairing David Janssen and she played in the 1955 film All That Heaven Allows. She also guest-starred in several episodes of ABC's Zorro.

In 1960, Talbott made guest-starring appearances as Nora Lanyard and Lucinda Jennings in the episodes "Landlubbers" and "Devil in Skirts" of the NBC Western series, Riverboat.  She was cast as Sandy in "The Velvet Frame" of the ABC/WB drama, The Roaring 20s. She also appeared in the ABC Western series, The Rebel and in Bonanza as Nedda in the episode "Escape to Ponderosa". In 1961, she portrayed Maria Mosner in the episode "The Twenty-Six Paper" of the ABC adventure series, The Islanders. That same year, she guest-starred in the episode "Buddy's Wife" of the CBS sitcom Bringing Up Buddy.
 
She appeared twice on CBS's TV Western series Bat Masterson, once in the 1958 episode "Trail Pirate" playing Ellen Parrish - a widowed yet brave wagon train owner, then again in the 1960 episode "Barbary Castle" playing Scottish-accented Mary MacLeod. She also appeared on CBS's Rawhide in the episodes "The Incident of the Calico Gun" (1959), "Incident of the Broken Word" (1960), and "Prairie Elephant" (1961). She appeared in the 1961 episode "Terror in the Afternoon" of the syndicated crime drama The Brothers Brannagan. 

Talbott made four guest appearances on the CBS courtroom drama series Perry Mason - defendant Eve Nesbitt in "The Case of the Angry Dead Man", Ann Gilrain in "The Case of the Crying Comedian" (both in 1961), co-defendant Bonnie Lloyd in the 1963 episode, "The Case of the Elusive Element", and Minna Rohan in the 1966 episode, "The Case of the Unwelcomed Well".

In 1962, she appeared again in an episode of Gunsmoke called "Cody's Code" and in 1963 in an episode entitled "The Cousin". 

In 1965, Talbott was cast in the lead in an episode of the syndicated series, Death Valley Days, "Kate Melville and the Law".

Personal life
Talbott was married four times and had two children.

Death
On September 19, 2000, Talbott died of kidney failure while hospitalized in Glendale, California.

Filmography

 Maytime (1937) - Little Girl (uncredited)
 Sweet and Low-Down (1944) - Teen-Ager on Dance Floor (uncredited)
 A Tree Grows in Brooklyn (1945) - Teen-Age Girl in Classroom (uncredited)
 Desert Pursuit (1952) - Indian Girl (uncredited)
 We're Not Married! (1952) - Girl in Hector's Daydream (uncredited)
 Northern Patrol (1953) - Meg Stevens
 Crashout (1955) - Girl on Train
 We're No Angels (1955) - Isabelle Ducotel
 All That Heaven Allows (1955) - Kay Scott
 Lucy Gallant (1955) - Laura Wilson
 Strange Intruder (1956) - Meg Carmichael
 The Young Guns (1956) - Nora Bawdre
 Mr. Adams and Eve (1957) - The Actress - Episode "The Young Actress"
 The Kettles on Old MacDonald's Farm (1957) - Sally Flemming
 The Oklahoman (1957) - Maria Smith
 The Cyclops (1957) - Susan Winter
 The Daughter of Dr. Jekyll (1957) - Janet Smith
 Taming Sutton's Gal (1957) - Lou Sutton
 The Restless Gun (1958) - as Valya in Episode "Hang and be Damned"
 The Restless Gun (1958) as Sophie Wilmer in Episode "The Outlander"
 Wanted: Dead or Alive (1958) as Jody Sykes in Episode "Fatal Memory"
 The Restless Gun (1958) as Mercyday in Episode "Mercyday"
 Cattle Empire (1958) - Sandy Jeffrey
 I Married a Monster from Outer Space (1958) - Marge Bradley Farrell
 Alias Jesse James (1959) - Princess Irawanie
 The Oregon Trail (1959) - Shona Hastings
 Girls Town (1959) - Vida
 Oklahoma Territory (1960) - Ruth Red Hawk
 The Leech Woman (1960) - Sally
 Whispering Smith (1961) - Cora Gates
 Gunsmoke (1955-1963, TV Series) - Hallie / Rose Loring / Holly Hawtree
 Arizona Raiders (1965) - Martina
 An Eye for an Eye (1966) - Bri Quince (final film role)

References

External links

 
 
Literature on Gloria Talbott

1931 births
2000 deaths
20th-century American actresses
American film actresses
American television actresses
Deaths from kidney failure
Actresses from Glendale, California
Actresses from California
Burials at San Fernando Mission Cemetery
American child actresses
American stage actresses